Déa Kulumbegashvili is a Georgian film director and writer, of Ossetian origin. She is known for her 2020 film Beginning, which won and was nominated for numerous awards.

Kulumbegashvili was born in Oriol, Russia (Oryol),  and raised in a small town called Lagodekhi at the foot of the Caucasus Mountains in Georgia. Her filmmaking has been informed by her experience of growing up in a place with such a mix of ethnicities and nationalities.

She went to New York, where she enrolled in the Media Studies course at The New School, before earning a Master of Fine Arts in Film Directing at Columbia University School of the Arts, where she enrolled in 2014.

Kulumbegashvili's debut short film, Ukhilavi Sivrtseebi (Invisible Spaces), was  nominated for the Palme d’Or at the 2014 Cannes Film Festival. In it, editor Rati Oneli played the father, one of three characters in a film about tensions in a small family. 

Her second short film, Lethe, premiered at the 2016 Cannes Film Festival in 2016. Both films were shown at MoMA in New York and also at many other film festivals.

She was co-writer and co-producer, with Rati Oneli (who also directed), of the feature-length documentary City of the Sun (2015–2017).

In 2016, Kulumbegashvili was awarded the 2016 Tsinandali Cinema Art Award in Georgia.

Beginning (2020) is Kulumbegashvili's first feature film. Originally given the working title Naked Sky, the film was awarded a production grant by the International Film Festival Rotterdam (IFFR), and Kulumbegashvili was given the Cannes Film Festival Cinéfondation residence in Paris, and other assistance with development by the Sam Spiegel International Film Lab, Sofia International Film Festival, and the Sarajevo Film Festival. The film debuted at the Toronto Film Festival in September 2020 and has won several awards.

References

Further reading

Kulumbegashvili, Dea (7 December 2020) Entrevista a la cineasta georgiana: “He crecido con la cultura cristiana muy dentro de mí” COPE (Interview). Interviewed by José Luis Panero

External links

Film directors from Georgia (country)
Women film directors from Georgia (country)
Living people
Year of birth missing (living people)